The Menda is a river in Yakutia (Sakha Republic), Russia.

The Menda is the second largest river of Khangalassky District. The village of Tit-Ebya is located near the mouth of the river. The Kyuyulyur waterfalls, a tourist attraction, are located in the Menda.

Course  
The Menda is a right tributary of the Lena. It is formed at the confluence of the Tala-Kyuyol and Onney-Ulur rivers in the Lena Plateau, between the Lena and the Amga. It heads in a roughly northern direction across taiga areas in its upper and middle course, parallel to the Tamma to the east. Then it bends to the northwest in its lower course, when it reaches the Lena floodplain and flows slowly among the swamps and small lakes of the area. Finally it meets the Lena  from its mouth north of the village of Tit-Ebya, south of Yakutsk.

In some stretches the river channel is bound by low cliffs. The Menda freezes between October and May.

See also
List of rivers of Russia

References

External links 

Fishing & Tourism in Yakutia

Rivers of the Sakha Republic